Senter syndrome is a cutaneous condition characterized by similar skin changes and congenital hearing impairment to keratitis–ichthyosis–deafness syndrome, but is associated with glycogen storage leading to hepatomegaly, hepatic cirrhosis, growth failure and intellectual disability.

See also 
 HID syndrome
 List of cutaneous conditions

References

External links 

Genodermatoses
Papulosquamous hyperkeratotic cutaneous conditions